Barbut is a surname, and may refer to:

 Cristian Bărbuț (born 1995), Romanian footballer
 James Barbut ( 1776–1791), English painter and naturalist
 Monique Barbut (born 1956), French public servant

See also
 Barbute, a visorless war helmet